Carmine Luppino (born 10 January 1948) is a retired Italian gymnast. He competed at the 1972 Olympics in all artistic gymnastics events and finished in 16th place with the Italian team. His best individual result was 60th place on the parallel bars.

References

1948 births
Living people
Gymnasts at the 1972 Summer Olympics
Olympic gymnasts of Italy
Italian male artistic gymnasts